Bernardino Machado was the third and eighth President of the First Portuguese Republic, having served two non-consecutive terms (1915-1917 and 1925–1926, respectively).

He was the first President of the newly established Portuguese Republic to make an international trip. During his (single) journey, that lasted from 8 to 25 October 1917, he travelled through Western Europe by train and visited several places in four countries during the First World War - its neutral neighbour Spain and three of its World War I Allies (Belgium, France and the United Kingdom).

Besides being welcomed by the heads of state of these countries (the Kings Alfonso XIII of Spain, George V of the United Kingdom and Albert I of Belgium, in addition to the French President Raymond Poincaré), Bernardino Machado also paid a visit to the Portuguese soldiers deployed in the Western Front.

Below is the route of the international trip made by Portuguese President.

First term (1915-1917)

1917

References

See also 
 List of international presidential trips made by Aníbal Cavaco Silva
 List of international presidential trips made by António José de Almeida
 List of international presidential trips made by Francisco Craveiro Lopes
 List of international presidential trips made by Marcelo Rebelo de Sousa
 List of international presidential trips made by Mário Soares

State visits
State visits by Portuguese presidents
20th century in international relations
Lists of diplomatic trips
Personal timelines